Eben Philip Barnard (born 29 January 1992) is a South African rugby union player who most recently played with the . His regular position is winger.

Career

He was included in the senior squad for the 2013 Vodacom Cup and made his first class debut against .

References

South African rugby union players
Eastern Province Elephants players
Living people
1992 births
Sportspeople from Paarl
Rugby union wings
Rugby union players from the Western Cape